Colin Hoyle (born 15 January 1972) is an English former professional footballer.

He started out at Arsenal, but never made a first-team appearance. After a loan spell at Chesterfield, he played for Barnsley, Bradford City, Notts County, Mansfield Town (loan), King's Lynn, Boston United, Burton Albion, Nuneaton Borough (loan), Halifax Town, Burton Albion (loan), Dagenham & Redbridge (loan), Burton Albion (loan), Burton Albion, Worcester City, Ilkeston Town and Gresley Rovers. He now is the assistant manager and 1st team coach at non-league Mickleover Sports.

External links

1972 births
Living people
English footballers
Arsenal F.C. players
Chesterfield F.C. players
Barnsley F.C. players
Bradford City A.F.C. players
Notts County F.C. players
Mansfield Town F.C. players
King's Lynn F.C. players
Boston United F.C. players
Burton Albion F.C. players
Nuneaton Borough F.C. players
Halifax Town A.F.C. players
Dagenham & Redbridge F.C. players
Worcester City F.C. players
Ilkeston Town F.C. (1945) players
Gresley F.C. players
Footballers from Derby
Association football defenders